Warfaze is the debut album by Bangladeshi heavy metal band Warfaze.

History 
"Warfaze" is the self-titled debut album of pioneer Bangladeshi Heavy Metal band Warfaze. It was released from Sargam in 1991 in cassette format with a later CD release in the late '90s. The CD was also re-released by Sargam in 2008. The album featured hits like "Boshe Achhi", "Ekti Chhele", "Bichchhinno Abeg", "Shadhikhar" etc. and during that time, this sound was unheard of in the Bangladeshi band music scene. Lyrics other than romanticism and patriotism were rare, so it took a while for this music to be accepted, especially in a band music scene where Pop largely dominated as the mainstream music of choice for bands. Warfaze, along with Rockstrata, In Dhaka and Aces are the sole reason why this genre of music became so popular, and gave way to the popularization of Progressive Rock, Progressive Metal and Hard Rock bands that emerged in the late '90s and early 2000s from the Underground era.

Warfaze was formed on June 6th, 1984, with an initial membership consisting of Kamal on Bass, Helal on Drums, Mir and Naimul sharing lead and rhythm guitar duties and Bappi on vocals. At this stage, the band was not that popular and the initial line-up underwent a change with Helal, Mir and Bappi having to leave the band for personal reasons. Kamal therefore took up the lead guitar duties for the band at this stage and the rest of the positions were filled up by Babna on bass, Tipu on drums and Rashed on vocals. This line-up unfortunately had to go through yet another change when Naimul decided to immigrate to the USA. Sunjoy joined as the vocalist and Russel Ali joined as the Keyboardist. At that time, only three other Dhaka-based bands shared this genre of music: Rockstrata, In Dhaka and Aces. Mashuk, who played lead guitar for In Dhaka, and Fuad, also from the same band volunteered to help Warfaze as guest members. Early on, Warfaze only played cover music of American and British bands. Most of the band members, including Kamal had made arrangements for further education in the United States by 1991. However, inspired by Maksud, former vocalist of Feedback, the band performed their own Bangla songs at a concert arranged by Bangladesh Musical Bands Association (BAMBA) at the University of Dhaka campus on 26 April, 1991. At this concert, the performing bands decided to make a mixed album, but it turned out that Warfaze actually had enough songs (and moreover, popularity) to debut their solo album. Finally, the band went on to release their self titled album from Sargam in 1991.

Track listing

Personnel 
 Sunjoy - lead vocals
 Babna Karim - bass guitar, vocals
Ibrahim Ahmed Kamal - lead guitars
 Sheikh Monirul Alam Tipu - drums
 Russell ali - Keyboard

Influence 
The album is considered as one of the earliest hard rock and heavy metal albums in Bangladesh. This was a pioneering rock album in Bangladesh where pop music was the dominant genre.

References 

1991 debut albums
Warfaze albums
Bangladeshi rock music